The Royal Textile Academy of Bhutan (རྒྱལ་འཛིན་ཐགས་རིགས་སློབ་སྡེ་) was founded to preserve and promote the living art of weaving which is an important part of the culture and tradition of Bhutan. Under the patronage of Her Majesty Ashi Sangay Choden Wangchuck, it is a non-government, non-profit organization established as an educational center for the training of individuals in traditional Bhutanese weaving.

Honours 
National honours
 Member of the National Order of Merit [in Gold] (17 December 2016).

See also
 Textiles of Bhutan
 Bhutan Textile Museum

References

External links
 Royal Textile Academy of Bhutan

Bhutanese culture
Textile organizations